Flera sidor av samma man was released on 5 July 2006, and is a Peter Jöback compilation album. Despite being released in mid-year, the album became the most sold in Sweden of 2006.

Track listing

CD 1
Jag står för allt jag gjort
En sång om oss
Tonight
Du har förlorat mer än jag
Sinner
Under My Skin
Gå inte förbi (duet with Sissel Kyrkjebø)
Gör Det Nu
Heal
Är det här platsen
She
I
Vem ser ett barn?
Varför Gud?
I'm Gonna Do It
Det måste finnas bättre liv än det här/på väg
Guldet blev till sand

CD 2
Jag blundar i Solens sken
Sommarens sista sång
Jag bär dig (duet with Sara Isaksson)
Higher
I din blick
She's Like a Butterfly
Varje gång vi ses
I Who Have Nothing
I Don't Care Much
Mellan en far och en son
Always on My Mind
Undress Me
Only When I Breathe
Hon ser inte mig
Searching for Love
Decembernatt (halleluja)
En sensation (bonus track)

Charts

References

2006 compilation albums
Compilation albums by Swedish artists
Peter Jöback albums
Sony Music compilation albums
Swedish-language compilation albums